Amin Asadi (Persian: امین اسدی, born September 14, 1993, in Tehran, Iran) is an Iranian professional footballer who plays as a right back for Saipa in the Persian Gulf Pro League. .

Club career 
He started his career with Apadana Tehran youth levels. Later he joined Shahin Tehran and Ehsan Rey youth academies.

Arman Gohar
He joined F.C. Arman Gohar in summer 2018. He made his debut for Arman Gohar on September 15, 2018.

Tractor
He joined Tractor in summer 2020. He made his debut for Tractor on September 20, 2020.

References 

 اسدی:‌ دوست ندارم بدون ثابت کردن خودم از تراکتور بروم/  گفته بودم در اولین حضورم در آزادی گل می‌زنم Retaved in Persian www.tasnimnews.com خبرگزاری تسنیم
مهاجم تیم فوتبال تراکتور:بازیکنان تراکتور برای کسب سهمیه می‌جنگند  Retaved in Persian www.mehrnews.com.com خبرگزاری مهر
امین اسدی به تراکتور پیوست  Retaved in Persian www.ilna.news.com.com خبرگزاری ایلنا

External links 
 

1993 births
Living people
Tractor S.C. players
Iranian footballers
Association football forwards